James Louis Gillis (October 3, 1857 – July 27, 1917) was an American librarian.

Biography
Gillis was born in Richmond, Iowa in 1857. By the time he was 14, his family had settled in Sacramento, California. Gillis then dropped out of school to become a messenger boy for a subsidiary of the Southern Pacific Railroad, the Sacramento Valley Railroad Company. After the Pullman railroad strike, Gillis retired from his position of assistant superintendent, having spent 22 years with Southern Pacific.

Gillis was extremely active with the Republican party when he retired, and because of connections he made politically, he became the archivist for the office of the Secretary of State of California in 1895. After a series of state positions, Gillis was appointed California State Librarian in 1899. Though most of his previous work experience did not include library topics, Gillis was nonetheless attracted to the job. Librarian Anne Margrave stated, 

Gillis was interested in organizing the chaotic library system and wanted it to benefit the whole community, not just capital officials. He served as California State Librarian from 1899 until his death in 1917. In that role, Gillis expanded the State Library’s services, established the California History Room, the California Research Bureau, a traveling library program, and library services for the blind in the state of California. He also established California’s county library system in 1909.

Gillis served as the President of the California Library Association from 1906 to 1916. He was inducted into the California Library Hall of Fame in 2012.

Publications
 California county free library law (1911)
 Descriptive list of the libraries of California (1904)
 Library laws of the state of California (1903)

References

External links 

 James L. Gillis collection, 1899-1957.
 Gillis Family collection. Collection guide, California State Library, California History Room.

1857 births
1917 deaths
American librarians
People from Washington County, Iowa